Dragica Sekulić (born 1980) is a Montenegrin politician, former Minister of Economy of the Duško Marković cabinet from 28 November 2016 to 4 December 2020. Born in Podgorica, she is member of Democratic Party of Socialists and graduated from the University of Montenegro Faculty of Electrical Engineering.

References

  

Living people
1980 births
Politicians from Podgorica
Government ministers of Montenegro
Montenegrin women in politics
University of Montenegro alumni
Democratic Party of Socialists of Montenegro politicians
Women government ministers of Montenegro